Paris is a genus of flowering plants described by Linnaeus in 1753. It is widespread across Europe and Asia, with a center of diversity in China.

It consists of less than two dozen herbaceous plants: the best known species is Paris quadrifolia. Some Paris species are used in traditional Chinese medicine for their analgesic and anticoagulant properties, most notably as an ingredient of Yunnan Baiyao.  Intense ethnopharmaceutical interest has significantly reduced their numbers.

These plants are closely related to Trillium, with the distinction traditionally being that Trillium contains species which have trimerous (three-petaled) flowers, and Paris contains species which have 4- to 11-merous flowers.  A recent analysis places the genera Daiswa and Kinugasa in Paris, though the actual circumscription of the genus is debated.

Etymology
From Latin herba Paris (Herba Paris), Paris herba, from Latin herba and Latin par (“equal”), in reference to the regularity of its leaves, petals, etc. It is neither related to the city Paris nor the Paris of Greek mythology.

Species
The genus consists of the following species:

References

 
 

Melanthiaceae
Melanthiaceae genera
Taxa named by Carl Linnaeus